Zahra Teymur gizi Guliyeva (born September 23, 1951) is a violinist, concertmaster, professor of Baku Music Academy, People's Artist of the Republic of Azerbaijan.

Biography 
Zahra Guliyeva was born on September 23, 1951 in Baku. She studied at the Secondary Music School named after Bulbul in 1959–1970. After entering the Hajibeyov Azerbaijan State Conservatoire in 1970, she studied here in the classes of Sarvar Ganiyev and M. Taghiyev and graduated in 1975 with honors. In 1976-1978, Zahra Guliyeva continued her education in the class of Boris Gutnikov in the assistant-internship department of the Leningrad Conservatory.

Career 
While studying at the Azerbaijan State Conservatory, Zahra Guliyeva performed a concert of Azerbaijani composers in Rostov, while at the Leningrad State Conservatory she performed in a number of concert halls and performed works by Azerbaijani and Western composers. She began her pedagogical activity in 1978 at the Azerbaijan State Conservatory. From that year to 1993 she worked here as a teacher at the "String instruments" department.

Zahra Guliyeva created "Elegance" author's program on Azerbaijan State Television between 1983-1990. She had talked here about the art, life and work of both Azerbaijani and world-famous artists and musicians. In 1990, Zahra Guliyeva was appointed First Deputy Chairman of the Union of Music Figures of Azerbaijan. During these years, she went on a number of concert tours, participated in the Aberdeen and NE Scotland Music Festival.

In 1993, at the invitation of Bilkent University in Turkey, Zahra Guliyeva began working there. She was a member of the international orchestra operating at the university. Zahra Guliyeva went there in 1998 at the invitation of the Governor of Macao (now a private administrative region of the People's Republic of China) and worked as a concertmaster of the Chamber Orchestra. She also continued her pedagogical activity at the Macao Conservatory, during which time she continued her active performance and gave numerous solo and orchestral concerts in various cities of China, as well as in Portugal and Spain.

Zahra Guliyeva, who returned to Azerbaijan in 2001, is currently performing and teaching. At the violin department of the Baku Music Academy, in addition to the performance class, she also lectures to students on the subject of "History of the violin art".

Z. Guliyeva has repeatedly performed in Azerbaijan, Turkey, Germany, Portugal, Italy, Bulgaria, the United States and a number of European cities, as well as held creative evenings. She is the author of first textbook "History of Violin Art" in the Azerbaijani language, methodical aids and textbooks on cello performance.

Awards 
 People's Artist of the Republic of Azerbaijan — September 17, 2008
 Honored Artist of the Republic of Azerbaijan — May 17, 1991
 Presidential pension — September 19, 2016

References 

Azerbaijani classical violinists
1951 births
Living people
Women classical violinists
20th-century classical violinists
20th-century Azerbaijani musicians
20th-century Azerbaijani women
20th-century women musicians
21st-century classical violinists
21st-century Azerbaijani musicians
21st-century Azerbaijani women
21st-century women musicians
Baku Academy of Music alumni
Saint Petersburg Conservatory alumni
Musicians from Baku
Academic staff of Bilkent University
Concertmasters
People's Artists of Azerbaijan